The Restless Stranger is the first album by American Music Club, released in 1985. It is considered to be the first slowcore album to be released.

Track listing
All songs written by Mark Eitzel. Tracks 13-15 are bonus tracks on the CD reissue.

"Room Above the Club" - 3:50
"$1,000,000 Song" - 3:56
"Away Down the Street" - 4:21
"Yvonne Gets Dumped" - 3:16
"Mr. Lucky" - 2:42
"Point of Desire" - 4:32
"Goodbye Reprise #54" - 3:54
"Tell Yourself" - 4:03 
"When Your Love Is Gone" - 4:19
"Heavenly Smile" - 1:58
"Broken Glass" - 4:23
"Hold on to Your Love" - 2:21
"Restless Stranger" - 4:04
"How Low? " - 4:23
"I'm in Heaven Now" - 3:51

Personnel
 Mark Eitzel - vocals
 Dan Pearson - bass
 Vudi - guitar
 Matt Norelli - drums
 Brad Johnson - Keyboards
 Bobby Neel Adams - photography

References

1985 debut albums
American Music Club albums